FC Zhemchuzhina may refer to the following association football clubs: 
FC Zhemchuzhina Budyonnovsk
FC Zhemchuzhina-Sochi
FC Zhemchuzhina Yalta